Tureaud is a surname. Notable people with the surname include:

A. P. Tureaud (1899–1972), American attorney
A. P. Tureaud Jr. (born  1936), African-American speaker, artist, educator, and author
Mr. T (born Laurence Tureaud, 1952), American actor, television personality, and wrestler